Charles du Vé Florey (born 1934) is a British public health physician and epidemiologist who is known for his work on the effects of air pollution on respiratory health.

Background
Florey is the son of Ethel Reed and Howard Florey who was appointed a life peer—Baron Florey—for his role in the development of penicillin. He derives the title The Honourable from his father. Florey married Susan Hopkins with whom he had two children.

Florey was educated at Rugby School and then went up to Cambridge University from where he graduated in 1956 with a BA.  He proceeded to University College London where he was awarded a MB, BCh in 1961. He then went to Yale University and obtained a MPH in 1963.

Career
 Reader in Community Medicine, Department of Community Medicine, St Thomas’s Hospital Medical School, London
 Professor of Public Health Medicine (formerly Community Medicine), University of Dundee

Awards and Positions
1994 - Chair, Society for Social Medicine

Key Publications
Charles du V Florey, Peter Burney D’Souza, Ellie Scrivens and Peter West. An Introduction to Community Medicine. London: Heinneman, 1983.

Charles du V Florey and Stephen Leeder.  Methods for Cohort Studies of Chronic Airflow Limitation. WHO Regional Office for Europe, 1982.

References

1939 births
People educated at Rugby School
British public health doctors
People associated with St Thomas's Hospital Medical School
Living people
Sons of life peers